The Applied Mechanics Award is an award given annually by the Applied Mechanics Division of American Society of Mechanical Engineers (ASME) "to an outstanding individual for significant contributions in the practice of engineering mechanics; contributions may result from innovation, research, design, leadership or education."  The Award is presented at the Applied Mechanics Annual Dinner at the ASME Congress.  In 2008, the Award was renamed to the Ted Belytschko Applied Mechanics Award.

Nomination procedure  
A letter of nomination and several letters of support, along with any other supporting materials, should be sent by email to the chair of the executive committee of the Applied Mechanics Division.  See the list of current members of the committee.

Recipients
2021 – Ellen Kuhl
2020 – Narayana R. Aluru
2019 – Somnath Ghosh
2018 – Tayfun Tezduyar
2017 – Jiun-Shyan Chen
2016 – Andrea Prosperetti
2015 – James R. Barber
2014 – Glaucio Paulino
2013 – Guirong Liu
2012 – David J. Benson
2011 – Ken P. Chong, David K. Gartling
2010 – Yoichiro Matsumoto
2009 – Eugenio Oñate
2008 – Shih Choon Fong
2007 – Oscar W. Dillon
2006 – Lewis Wheeler
2005 – Carl Herakovich
2004 – Arthur Leissa
2003 – John O. Hallquist
2002 – David E. Newland
2001 – Dan Mote
2000 – Dick MacNeal
1999 – Karl Pister
1998 – John A. Swanson		
1997 – Richard Skalak
1996 – Sheila Widnall
1995 – Harry Armen
1994 – Siegfried S. Hecker
1993 – David Hibbit
1992 – William G. Gottengerg
1991 – George Abrahamson
1990 – Owen Richmond
1989 – Sam Levy
1988 – H. Norman Abramson

See also

 List of mechanical engineering awards
Applied Mechanics Division
American Society of Mechanical Engineers
Applied mechanics
Mechanician

References

External links
Homepage of the ASME International Applied Mechanics Division

Awards of the American Society of Mechanical Engineers